Bathyonus is a genus of cusk-eels.

Species
There are currently three recognized species in this genus:
 Bathyonus caudalis (Garman, 1899)
 Bathyonus laticeps (Günther, 1878)
 Bathyonus pectoralis Goode & Bean, 1885

References

Ophidiidae